Fridtjof Nansen Peninsula is a peninsula in the King Frederick VI Coast, southeastern Greenland. It is a part of the Sermersooq municipality.

Geography

The Fridtjof Nansen Peninsula is limited to the northeast by a strait across which lie the Søren Norby Islands, beyond which lies the bay of Pikiulleq. To the southeast it is bound by the Irminger Sea and to the southwest by Umivik Bay, with two large islands, Upernattivik (Upernarsuak) and Trefoldigheden off the shore. 

To the west and the northwest the peninsula is attached to the mainland. Several small islands where there are Paleo-Eskimo archaeological sites lie off its southeastern point.

See also
Fridtjof Nansen: The Crossing of Greenland
Tunumiit

References

External links 
 Seabirds and seals in Southeast Greenland

Peninsulas of Greenland
Sermersooq